T. carboxydivorans may refer to:

Terrabacter carboxydivorans, a Gram-positive bacterium.
Thermolithobacter carboxydivorans, a Gram-positive bacterium.
Thermosinus carboxydivorans, a Gram-negative bacterium.
Tsukamurella carboxydivorans, a Gram-positive bacterium.